Weldon Heyburn (born Weldon Heyburn Franks; September 19, 1903 – May 18, 1951) was an American character actor.

Early years
The son of Marie Pierce and United States Army Col. Wyatt G. Franks, Heyburn was most likely born in Washington, D.C. although other sources indicate Selma, Alabama or Delaware City, Delaware as the place of birth.

Heyburn attended Central High School and Emerson Institute (both in Washington, D.C.), before attending the University of Alabama.

In the 1920s, Heyburn represented himself as "the son of Charles Heyburn, judge of the United States Supreme Court" and "the nephew of Weldon Heyburn, the late Senator of Iowa." The senator's niece denied any kinship, saying in 1925 that Heyburn was "an impostor if he persists in his claims", with other members of the family supporting her assertion.

Stage
In the mid-1920s, Heyburn was the "leading man in a Lansing, Mich., stock company." His Broadway credits include The Mystery Man (1927), Troyka (1930, Good Men and True (1935), and I Want a Policeman (1936).

Film
In 1931, Heyburn ventured into film. An August 31, 1931, newspaper article reported, "After playing leading man for such stage stars as Jeanne Eagels, Lenore Ulric and Mary Boland, he has given up the stage to become a feature screen player like his roommate and fellow gridiron player, John Mack Brown."

Military service
During World War II, Heyburn served in the U.S. Army Signal Corps.

Personal life
In 1924, Heyburn married actress Phyllis Connard. They divorced October 15, 1926.

Heyburn married Norwegian star Greta Nissen March 30, 1932, in Tijuana, Mexico. They met when they appeared together in The Silent Witness (1932), she as the female lead, he as an unbilled player. On October 19, 1935, Nissen went to court to have the marriage annulled, "charging their marriage ... was illegal and violated legal witness and residence requirements." The annulment was granted April 30, 1936.

Heyburn married Jane Eichelberger ("prominent socially in New York and Cleveland") on May 5, 1936, at Heyburn's home in Brentwood, California. They divorced in 1939. His last marriage was to socialite Virginia Maggard in September 1939. He was divorced when he enlisted in the U.S. Army in May 1942. 

He also had relationships with actress Grace Brinkley and debutante Dorothy McCallam.

Death

A drinking problem effectively ended his career in the mid-1940s and his health rapidly declined. He entered the Veterans Administration Hospital in Los Angeles suffering from cancer of the mouth, right adrenal and kidney and died there of pneumonia. He was interred in Arlington National Cemetery in Arlington County, Virginia.

Partial filmography
Heyburn appeared in about 65 films from 1930 through 1950. They include:

 The Last Parade (1931) - Henchman (uncredited)
The Silent Witness (1932) - Carl Blake
 Careless Lady (1932) - Jud Carey
 Chandu the Magician (1932) - Abdulah
 Call Her Savage (1932) - Ronasa
 West of Singapore (1933) - Dan Manton
 Hired Wife (1934) - Kent Johns
 Convention Girl (1935) - Bill Bradley
 Dynamite Delaney (1936) - 'Dynamite' Delaney
 Speed (1936) - Frank Lawson
 Git Along Little Dogie (1937) - George Wilkins
 The 13th Man (1937) - Swifty Taylor
 Sea Racketeers (1937) - Chief Bos'n Mate Jim Wilson
 Atlantic Flight (1937) - Bill Edwards
 Every Day's a Holiday (1937) - Guest at Party (uncredited)
 Saleslady (1938) - Bob Spencer
 Crime School (1938) - Cooper
 The Mysterious Rider (1938) - Jack Bellounds
 Panama Patrol (1939) - Lt. Murdock
 Should a Girl Marry? (1939) - Harry Gilbert
 Fugitive at Large (1939) - Corrick
 Emergency Squad (1940) - Lennie - Squad Member with Newspaper (uncredited)
 Women Without Names (1940) - Guard (uncredited)
 North West Mounted Police (1940) - Constable Cameron (uncredited)
 The Trail Blazers (1940) - Jeff Bradley
 Flight from Destiny (1941) - Brooks
 The Round Up (1941) - 'Cheyenne'
 In Old Colorado (1941) - Blackie Reed
 Redhead (1941) - Winston
 Caught in the Draft (1941) - Sergeant at Examining Depot (uncredited)
 Criminals Within  (1941) - Sgt. Blake (uncredited)
 Stick to Your Guns (1941) - Henchman Gila
 Jungle Man (1941) - Bruce Kellogg
 They Died with Their Boots On (1941) - Staff Officer (uncredited)
 Steel Against the Sky (1941) - Minor Role (scenes deleted)
 You're in the Army Now (1941) - Sergeant of the Guard (uncredited)
 Code of the Outlaw (1942) - Pop Hardin
 Rock River Renegades (1942) - Jim Dawson aka Phil Sanford
 Blazing Guns (1943) - Henchman Vic
 Overland Mail Robbery (1943) - John Patterson
 Death Valley Manhunt (1943) - Richard Quinn
 Death Valley Rangers (1943) - James Kirk
 Westward Bound (1944) - Albert Lane
 My Best Gal (1944) - (uncredited)
 The Chinese Cat (1944) - Det. Harvey Dennis
 Man from Frisco (1944) - Man in Trailer (uncredited)
 The Yellow Rose of Texas (1944) - Charley Goss
 Bordertown Trail (1944) - New Orleans
 When Strangers Marry (1944) - Bill - Police Sergeant (uncredited) (unbilled)
 Code of the Prairie (1944) - Jess Wyatt
 The Princess and the Pirate (1944) - Soldier at the Palace (uncredited)
 Here Come the Waves (1944) - Civilian (uncredited)
 Incendiary Blonde (1945) - Shill at Party for Louella Parsons (uncredited)
 Frontier Gunlaw (1946) - Matt Edwards
 A Southern Yankee (1948) - Confederate Officer (uncredited)
 Alias Nick Beal (1949) - Minor Role (uncredited)
 Samson and Delilah (1949) - Temple Spectator (uncredited)
 Perfect Strangers (1950) - Man Resisting Jury Duty (uncredited)
 The Damned Don't Cry (1950) - Robert - The Butler (uncredited)
 The Great Jewel Robber (1950) - Captain of the Guards (uncredited) (final film role)

References

External links

 

1903 births
1951 deaths
American male film actors
American male stage actors
20th-century American male actors